Electrified is a studio album from Denver quartet Dressy Bessy.  The album was released on Transdreamer Records in June 2005.

Track listing
All tracks written by Tammy Ealom
"Side 2"
"Stop Foolin'"
"Electrified"
"Small"
"She Likes It"
"Who'd Stop the Rain"
"Hellohellohello"
"Ringalingaling"
"It Happens All the Time"
"Call It Even Later"
"Try Try Try Again"
"Second Place"

References

2005 albums
Dressy Bessy albums